Lehner Grain-and-Cider Mill and House is a historic structure located at 548 and 560 Penn Street in Verona, Pennsylvania. It was built circa 1895.

Charles Lehner, who built the mill, and his wife Mary Magdalene Huber immigrated from Austria to Pittsburgh's North Side and later to Verona. The mill began operating in 1896. Lehner died in 1908 and the mill was run by his son Joseph until 1920 when he tragically  passed and his wife of three daughters had to sell it.

Christine Davis Consultants, who work in archeological studies and historic preservation, bought the mill in the 1990s.

It was added to the National Register of Historic Places on October 24, 1996.

References

Industrial buildings and structures on the National Register of Historic Places in Pennsylvania
Buildings and structures in Allegheny County, Pennsylvania
Houses completed in 1895
National Register of Historic Places in Allegheny County, Pennsylvania